Philip Marlowe is a fictional character created by Raymond Chandler, who was characteristic of the hardboiled crime fiction genre. The hardboiled crime fiction genre originated in the 1920s, notably in Black Mask magazine, in which Dashiell Hammett's The Continental Op and Sam Spade first appeared. Marlowe first appeared under that name in The Big Sleep, published in 1939. Chandler's early short stories, published in pulp magazines such as Black Mask and Dime Detective, featured similar characters with names like "Carmady" and "John Dalmas", starting in 1933.

Some of those short stories were later combined and expanded into novels featuring Marlowe, a process Chandler called "cannibalizing", which is more commonly known in publishing as a fix-up. When the original stories were republished years later in the short-story collection The Simple Art of Murder, Chandler did not change the names of the protagonists to Philip Marlowe. His first two stories, "Blackmailers Don't Shoot" and "Smart-Aleck Kill" (with a detective named Mallory), were never altered in print but did join the others as Marlowe cases for the television series Philip Marlowe, Private Eye.

Underneath the wisecracking, hard-drinking, tough private eye, Marlowe is quietly contemplative, philosophical and enjoys chess and poetry. While he is not afraid to risk physical harm, he does not dish out violence merely to settle scores. Morally upright, he is not fooled by the genre's usual femmes fatales, such as Carmen Sternwood in The Big Sleep. Chandler's treatment of the detective novel exhibits an effort to develop the form. His first full-length book, The Big Sleep, was published when Chandler was 51; his last, Playback, was published when he was 70. He created seven novels in the last two decades of his life. An eighth, Poodle Springs, was completed posthumously by Robert B. Parker and published years later.

Inspiration
Explaining the origin of Marlowe's character, Chandler commented, "Marlowe just grew out of the pulps. He was no one person". When creating the character, Chandler had originally intended to call him Mallory; his stories for the Black Mask  featured characters that are considered precursors to Marlowe. The emergence of Marlowe coincided with Chandler's transition from writing short stories to novels.

Biographical notes

Philip Marlowe is a fictional character created by Raymond Chandler in a series of novels including The Big Sleep, Farewell, My Lovely, and The Long Goodbye. Chandler is not consistent as to Marlowe's age. In The Big Sleep, set in 1936, Marlowe's age is given as 33, while in The Long Goodbye (set 14 years later), Marlowe is 42. In a letter to D. J. Ibberson of April 19, 1951, Chandler noted among other things that Marlowe is 38 years old and was born in Santa Rosa, California. He had a couple of years at college and some experience as an investigator for an insurance company and the district attorney's office of Los Angeles County. He was fired from the DA's office for insubordination (or as Marlowe put it, "talking back"). The DA's chief investigator, Bernie Ohls, is a friend and former colleague and a source of information for Marlowe within law enforcement.

He is described as having dark hair and a medium heavy build (Farewell, My Lovely); dark brown hair with some grey and brown eyes (The Long Good-bye). Marlowe first lived at the Hobart Arms, on Franklin Avenue near North Kenmore Avenue (in The Big Sleep) but then moved to the Bristol Hotel, where he stayed for about 10 years. By 1950 (in The Long Good-bye) he has rented a house on Yucca Avenue in Laurel Canyon and continued at the same place in early 1952 in Playback, Chandler's last full-length Marlowe novel.

His office, originally on the seventh floor of an unnamed building in 1936, is at #615 on the sixth floor of the Cahuenga Building by March–April 1939 (the date of Farewell, My Lovely), which is on Hollywood Boulevard near Ivar. North Ivar Avenue is between North Cahuenga Boulevard to the west and Vine Street to the east. The office telephone number is GLenview 7537. Marlowe's office is modest and he does not have a secretary (unlike Sam Spade). He generally refuses to take divorce cases.

He drinks whiskey or brandy frequently and in relatively large quantities. For example, in The High Window, he gets out a bottle of Four Roses and pours glasses for him, Det. Lt. Breeze and Spangler. At other times, he is drinking Old Forester, a Kentucky bourbon, "I hung up and fed myself a slug of Old Forester to brace my nerves for the interview. As I was inhaling it I heard her steps tripping along the corridor". (The Little Sister) However, in Playback he orders a double Gibson at a bar while tailing Betty Mayfield. Also, in The Long Good-bye, Terry Lennox and he drink Gimlets; in the same novel he also orders a whiskey sour and drinks Cordon Rouge champagne with Linda Loring.

Marlowe is adept at using liquor to loosen peoples' tongues. An example is in The High Window, when Marlowe finally persuades the detective-lieutenant, whose "solid old face was lined and grey with fatigue", to take a drink: "Breeze looked at me very steadily. Then he sighed. Then he picked the glass up and tasted it and sighed again and shook his head sideways with a half smile; the way a man does when you give him a drink and he needs it very badly and it is just right and the first swallow is like a peek into a cleaner, sunnier, brighter world".

He frequently drinks coffee. Eschewing the use of filters (see Farewell, My Lovely), he uses a vacuum coffee maker (see The Long Good-bye, chapter 5). He smokes and prefers Camel cigarettes. At home, he sometimes smokes a pipe. A chess adept, he almost exclusively plays against himself or plays games from books.

Typical of classic private eyes, Marlowe is the eternal bachelor in the novels but in the opening paragraphs of Poodle Springs he has just married Linda Loring, the divorced daughter of press tycoon Harlan Potter. He knows her from The Long Good-bye, where they spent one night together and from Playback, where she, after one and a half years, surprisingly called him from Paris and proposed to him ("I'm asking you to marry me.").

Marlowe bibliography

Original short stories by Raymond Chandler
 Blackmailers Don't Shoot (December 1933, Black Mask; protagonist named Mallory)
 Smart-Aleck Kill (July 1934, Black Mask; Mallory)
 Finger Man (October 1934, Black Mask; Carmady)
 Killer in the Rain (January 1935, Black Mask; Carmady)
 Nevada Gas (June 1935, Black Mask)
 Spanish Blood (November 1935, Black Mask)
 Guns at Cyrano's (January 1936, Black Mask; Ted Malvern)
 The Man Who Liked Dogs (March 1936, Black Mask; Carmady)
 Noon Street Nemesis (May 30, 1936, Detective Fiction Weekly; or "Pick-up on Noon Street")
 Goldfish (June 1936, Black Mask; Carmady)
 The Curtain (September 1936, Black Mask; Carmady)
 Try the Girl (January 1937, Black Mask; Carmady)
 Mandarin's Jade (November 1937, Dime Detective; John Dalmas)
 Red Wind (January 1938, Dime Detective: John Dalmas)
 The King in Yellow (March 1938, Dime Detective)
 Bay City Blues (June 1938; Dime Detective; John Dalmas)
 The Lady in the Lake (January 1939, Dime Detective; John Dalmas)
 Pearls Are a Nuisance (April 1939, Dime Detective)
 Trouble Is My Business (August 1939, Dime Detective; John Dalmas)
 I'll Be Waiting (October 14, 1939, Saturday Evening Post)
 The Bronze Door (November 1939, Unknown)
 No Crime in the Mountains (September 1941, Detective Story, John Evans)

Original Philip Marlowe works by Raymond Chandler
 The Big Sleep (1939)
 Farewell, My Lovely (1940)
 The High Window (1942)
 The Lady in the Lake (1943)
 The Little Sister (1949)
 The Long Goodbye (1953)
 Playback (1958)
 "The Pencil" (or "Marlowe Takes On the Syndicate", "Wrong Pigeon" and "Philip Marlowe's Last Case") (1959), (short story). Chandler's last completed work about Marlowe, his first Marlowe short story in more than 20 years and the first short story originally written about Marlowe
 The Poodle Springs Story in Raymond Chandler Speaking (1962) (only the first four chapters were completed and then left unfinished at Chandler's death in 1959; Robert B. Parker extended the material to a full-length novel, Poodle Springs, in 1989.)

Authorized works by other writers

 El Diez Por Ciento de Vida by Hiber Conteris (Spain, 1985), English translation as Ten Percent of Life by Deborah Bergmann (1987). Marlowe probes the 1956 "suicide" of a Hollywood literary agent, one of whose clients is Raymond Chandler.
 Raymond Chandler's Philip Marlowe: A Centennial Celebration, ed. Byron Preiss (1988, ; extended edition 1999); reprints The Pencil alongside Philip Marlowe stories by other authors:
 The Perfect Crime by Max Allan Collins
 The Black-Eyed Blonde by Benjamin M. Schutz
 Gun Music by Loren D. Estleman
 Saving Grace by Joyce Harrington
 Maliby Tag Team by Jonathan Valin
 Sad-Eyed Blonde by Dick Lochte
 The Empty Sleeve by W. R. Philbrick
 Dealer's Choice by Sara Paretsky
 Red Rock by Julie Smith
 The Deepest South by Paco Ignacio Taibo II
 Consultation in the Dark by Francis M. Nevins Jr
 In the Jungle of Cities by Roger L. Simon
 Star Bright by John Lutz
 Stardust Kill by Simon Brett
 Locker 246 by Robert J. Randisi
 Bitter Lemons by Stuart M. Kaminsky
 The Man Who Knew Dick Bong by Robert Crais
 Essence D'Orient by Edward D. Hoch
 In The Line of Duty by Jeremiah Healey
 The Alibi by Ed Gorman
 The Devil's Playground by James Grady
 Asia by Eric Van Lustbader
 Mice by Robert Campbell
 Sixty-Four Squares by J. Madison Davis (1999 edition)
 Summer In Idle Valley by Roger L. Simon (1999 edition)

Authorized novels by other writers
 Poodle Springs (1989), by Robert B. Parker. An authorized completion of Chandler's unfinished last work; the original text 'The Poodle Springs Story' had been published alongside excerpts from Chandler's letters, notes and essays in Raymond Chandler Speaking (1971), by Dorothy Gardener and Katherine Sorley Walker. New York: Books for Library Press.
 Perchance to Dream (1991), by Robert B. Parker. An authorized sequel to Chandler's The Big Sleep.
 The Black-Eyed Blonde (2014), by John Banville writing as "Benjamin Black," is an authorized sequel to The Long Goodbye, and reuses the title of Benjamin M. Schutz's otherwise-unrelated Marlowe story.
 Only to Sleep (2018), by Lawrence Osborne, finds the elderly Marlowe in Mexico in 1988, investigating the “accidental” swimming death of a debt-ridden con man/developer.
 The Goodbye Coast (2022), by Joe Ide, a reimagining of the character, set in present day Los Angeles.

Film adaptations

 The Falcon Takes Over (1942) – (adaptation of Farewell, My Lovely with detective "The Falcon" substituting for Marlowe) George Sanders as The Falcon.
 Time to Kill (1942) – (adaptation of The High Window with detective Michael Shayne substituting for Marlowe) Lloyd Nolan as Shayne.
 Murder, My Sweet (1944) – (adaptation of [and released in the UK as] Farewell, My Lovely) Dick Powell as Marlowe.
 The Big Sleep (1946) – Humphrey Bogart as Marlowe.
 Lady in the Lake (1947) – Robert Montgomery as Phillip Marlowe ("Phillip" is spelled with two "l"s in this film.)
 The Brasher Doubloon (1947) – (adaptation of [and released in the UK as] The High Window) George Montgomery as Marlowe.
 Marlowe (1969) – (adaptation of The Little Sister) James Garner as Marlowe. This became the partial inspiration for The Rockford Files, the other being the series Maverick.
 The Long Goodbye (1973) – Elliott Gould as Marlowe.
 Farewell, My Lovely (1975) – Robert Mitchum as Marlowe.
 The Big Sleep (1978) – Robert Mitchum as Marlowe.
 Marlowe (2022) – (adaptation of The Black-Eyed Blonde by Benjamin Black) Liam Neeson as Marlowe.

Radio and television adaptations

Radio
 Lux Radio Theater, "Murder My Sweet", adapted from the 1944 film, CBS Radio, June 11, 1945 (Dick Powell as Marlowe)
 The New Adventures of Philip Marlowe, NBC Radio series, June 17, 1947 to September 9, 1947 (Van Heflin as Marlowe)
 Suspense, CBS radio, January 10, 1948 (cameo by series host Robert Montgomery in The Adventures of Sam Spade cross-over, "The Kandy Tooth")
 Lux Radio Theater, "Lady in the Lake", adapted from the 1947 film, CBS Radio, February 9, 1948 (Robert Montgomery as Marlowe)
 Hollywood Star Time, "Murder My Sweet", adapted from the 1944 film, CBS Radio, June 8, 1948 (Dick Powell as Marlowe)
 The Adventures of Philip Marlowe, CBS Radio series, September 26, 1948 to September 15, 1951 (Gerald Mohr as Marlowe)
 The BBC Presents: Philip Marlowe, BBC Radio series, September 26, 1977 to September 23, 1988 (Ed Bishop as Marlowe)
 In 2011 the BBC started a series of radio adaptations of all the Philip Marlowe novels under the heading Classic Chandler. Toby Stephens played Philip Marlowe throughout. The series started on February 5, 2011, on BBC Radio 4 with a 90-minute adaptation of The Big Sleep and continued with adaptations of The Lady in the Lake (February 12, 2011), Farewell, My Lovely (February 19, 2011) and a 60-minute version of Playback (February 26, 2011). The series continued later that year with 90-minute adaptations of The Long Goodbye (October 1, 2011). The High Window (October 8, 2011), The Little Sister (October 15, 2011) and a 60-minute version of Poodle Springs (October 22, 2011).

Television
 Robert Montgomery Presents, "The Big Sleep", adapted from the novel, NBC Television, September 25, 1950 (Zachary Scott as Marlowe)
 Climax!, "The Long Goodbye", adapted from the novel, CBS Television, October 7, 1954 (Dick Powell as Marlowe)
 Philip Marlowe, ABC Television series, October 6, 1959 to March 29, 1960 (Philip Carey as Marlowe)
 Philip Marlowe, Private Eye, HBO/London Weekend Television series, April 16, 1983 to May 14, 1983, April 27, 1986 to June 3, 1986 (Powers Boothe as Marlowe)
 Fallen Angels, "Red Wind", adapted from the short story, Showtime Television, November 26, 1995 (Danny Glover as Marlowe)
 Poodle Springs, adapted from the novel (a fragment completed by Robert B. Parker), HBO Television movie, July 25, 1998 (James Caan as Marlowe)
 Marlowe, a 2007 TV pilot (Jason O'Mara as Marlowe)

Theater adaptations 
Marlowe has appeared on stage at least twice. An adaptation of The Little Sister in 1978 in Chicago starred Mike Genovese as Marlowe. In 1982, Richard Maher and Roger Michell wrote Private Dick, in which Chandler has lost the manuscript for a novel, and calls in Marlowe to help find it. The production played in London, with  Robert Powell as Marlowe.

Video game adaptations
 Philip Marlowe: Private Eye, Byron Preiss (developer), Simon & Schuster (publisher), 1996–1997

Podcasts 
In 2018 an unauthorized original Philip Marlowe audio fiction, A Man Named Marlowe was produced by The WallBreakers. Set in 1935, the story predates The Big Sleep and tells of a Marlowe run-in with two supposedly dead gunmen from the old west: Butch Cassidy and the Sundance Kid.

References in other works

 The character appears in the 1982 comedy film Dead Men Don't Wear Plaid, played by Humphrey Bogart, through clips pulled from The Big Sleep and other films.
 In the pilot episode of Bored to Death, the main character Jonathan Ames (played by Jason Schwartzman) reads Farewell, My Lovely and uses the name Philip Marlowe as a pseudonym.
 The central character in Dennis Potter's The Singing Detective is crime novelist Philip E. Marlow, portrayed in the original TV version by Michael Gambon and in the later film version by Robert Downey Jr.
 Marlowe is referenced in the lyrics to Burton Cummings' 1979 song "Dream of a Child" and Dire Straits' "Private Investigations".
 The two main characters of the film Radioactive Dreams are named Philip and Marlowe; Philip narrates it in a similar style as Chandler's novels.
 In the Star Trek: The Next Generation episode "The Big Goodbye", a computer malfunction traps Jean-Luc Picard, Data, and Beverly Crusher in a 1940s Dixon Hill detective story holodeck program, in homage to such characters as Marlowe and Sam Spade, among others.
 In Kamen Rider W, Sokichi Narumi gives Raito Sonozaki the name "Philip" due to his fondness of Philip Marlowe.
 Smart Philip (2003): Crime comedy film inspired by Chandler's work with Tomáš Hanák as Philip Marlowe.

See also

 Crime fiction for an overview

References

External links
 Philip Marlowe on IMDb
 BBC Radio 4 Presents: Classic Chandler

Audio
 OTR Network Library: The Adventures of Philip Marlowe (63 episodes)

Fictional characters from Los Angeles
Fictional private investigators
Series of books
Characters in pulp fiction
Characters in American novels of the 20th century
Literary characters introduced in 1939
Thriller film characters
Crime film characters
Characters in short stories
Detective fiction short stories
Male characters in literature
Male characters in film
Fictional people from the 20th-century